LocalBitcoins was a peer-to-peer bitcoin exchange platform based in Helsinki, Finland. 

Its service facilitated over-the-counter trading of local currency for bitcoins. Users post advertisements on the website, where they state exchange rates and payment methods for buying or selling bitcoins. Other users reply to these advertisements and make the payment in their specified payment method. As of December 2020, LocalBitcoins has over 1,000,000 active traders with a trade volume
of 612 million US dollars between October and December 2020.

History 
LocalBitcoins was founded in June 2012 by Jeremias Kangas. He implemented an escrow system for the marketplace by the end of 2012. The website started generating revenue by the beginning of 2013, now as of 2020 there
are an average of 29,566 successful trades per day.

In 2018, LocalBitcoins headed the list of best financially performing companies in Finland arranged by the local specialized publication Kauppalehti.

In 2014, 2016, and 2018 people who used the site were arrested for money laundering and related crimes.

In January 2019, hackers stole bitcoin worth $28,200 from users' LocalBitcoins accounts. LocalBitcoins was able to identify and solve the case immediately, announcing so to its users. On the same day, LocalBitcoins shared that LocalBitcoins accounts were safe to use and emphasized the importance of two-factor authentication.

In November 2019, LocalBitcoins.com got registered as a Virtual Currency Provider by the Finnish Financial Supervisory Authority.

On February 9, 2023, LocalBitcoins announced it will cease operations later in February.

Services
The website offered a service to facilitate the locating of Bitcoin users, who can meet for person to person trading of bitcoin. The site is suggested for casual traders seeking more privacy. The site uses an escrow system, and the transfer of bitcoin is made after funds are received in the sellers account. LocalBitcoins has a reputation system for users and an escrow and conflict resolution service.

References

External links
 

Bitcoin companies
Financial services companies established in 2012
Financial services companies of Finland
Finnish companies established in 2012
Companies based in Helsinki